A Calcutta auction is an open auction held in conjunction with a golf tournament, horse race or similar contest with multiple entrants.  It is popular in backgammon, the Melbourne Cup, and college basketball pools during March Madness. Culcutta auction is a sequential auction, where the bidding for each contestant begins in random order, with only one contestant being bid upon at any time. Accordingly, participants (originally in Calcutta, India, from where this technique was first recorded by the Colonial British) bid among themselves to "buy" each of the contestants, with each contestant being assigned to the highest bidder. The contestant will then pay out to the owner a predetermined proportion of the pool depending on how it performs in the tournament. While variations in payoff schedules exist, in an NCAA Basketball tournament (64 teams, single elimination) the payoffs could be: 1 win - 0.25%, 2 wins - 2%, 3 wins - 4%, 4 wins - 8%, 5 wins - 16%, tournament winner with 6 wins - 32%.

The precise rules of a Calcutta can vary from place to place; many tournament organizers employ software programs that apply odds and determine win-place-show amounts. Perhaps the simplest and most common Calcutta payout is 70 percent of the pool to the "owner" of the winning tournament team, 30 percent to the "owner" of the second-place tournament team.

An interesting element of Calcutta auctions is in determining an appropriate wager for each contestant, as the payoff will directly hinge on the size of the pot and thereby the size of the bids being placed. Thus the value of each team fluctuates during the course of the betting. For example, even if a bidder knew the University of North Carolina would be the tournament winner and thus pay out 32% of the pool, he would still be unsure of the exact value of the team (unless it was the last team being bid on) since the payout depends on the sum total of all winning bids, i.e. the final size of the pool.

Another typical variation in NCAA Calcutta auctions is the bundling and auctioning off as a block the lowest seeded teams in each region, called the "Dogs". For example, the 16th to 13th seeded teams from the Midwest Region would be bid upon as a bundle named the "Dogs of the Midwest". The winning bidder would own all 4 teams and usually recoups his or her investment if one or two of the Dogs wins an upset.

This is similar to parimutuel betting, in that the winnings are awarded from the total pool of bets, but differs in that only one player can bet on any one contestant. However, a player may purchase as many contestants as they desire.

One variation that has grown as the Calcutta auction is used more in conjunction with March Madness involves auctioning teams off in the reverse order of their seeds instead of random order. As bidding evolves, this aids bidders in estimating the final pot size since the heavily favored teams that command the highest bids are auctioned at the end, thereby limiting the risk on the larger bets.

A Calcutta golf tournament is seen in the 1967 film Banning.

Notes

Types of auction
Backgammon
Melbourne Cup
Wagering